Arsenal Design Bureau is an engineering company active in the fields of space technology, ship artillery and civilian machine building. The company was founded in 1711 and is located in Saint Petersburg in the Russian Federation. Its full name is Arsenal Design Bureau named after Mikhail Vasil’evich Frunze Federal State Unitary Enterprise.

Overview 
The company's main purpose is development and operation of space complexes and spacecraft for various purposes, and development and creation of navy artillery mounts and launchers. KB Arsenal is the developer of Liana electronic reconnaissance program, intended to replace the EORSATS and Tselina 2.

History 
KB Arsenal was founded in 1711 by Tsar Peter I of Russia as a cannon foundry. Renamed to TsBK-7, the company created ICBMs between 1960 and 1980, after which it switched its focus to space research. It is the developer of over 80 spacecraft in the COSMOS series, including Russia's first nuclear power system satellites, the Kosmos 1818 and Kosmos 1867. It is the oldest Russian/Soviet design bureau connected to space research.

References

External links 
Company website
Archived Old Company website

Spacecraft manufacturers
Soviet and Russian space institutions
Aerospace companies of the Soviet Union
Manufacturing companies established in 1711
1711 establishments in Russia
Federal State Unitary Enterprises of Russia
Roscosmos divisions and subsidiaries
Companies based in Saint Petersburg
Ministry of the Defense Industry (Soviet Union)
Design bureaus